Mawlawi Mohammad Yunus Khalis (alternate spellings Yunis and Younas) (c. 1919 – 19 July 2006) was a mujahideen commander in Afghanistan during the Soviet–Afghan War. His party was called Hezb-i-Islami ("Islamic Party"), the same as Gulbuddin Hekmatyar's party. The two are commonly differentiated as Hezb-e Islami Khalis and Hezb-e-Islami Gulbuddin.

Biography
Belonging to the Khugiani tribe of Pashtuns, Maulvi Mohammad Yunus Khalis was born in 1919 in Khogyani District, Nangarhar Province in Afghanistan and became a powerful figure in his country’s turbulent modern history. Educated in Islamic law and theology at the Darul Uloom Haqqania in Pakistan, Khalis exercised influence through his conservative vision of Islamic society.  Sometimes referred to as the don of Nangarhar, he was also a shrewd politician who wielded considerable power behind the scenes during one of the most turbulent and violent periods in his country’s history.

After the overthrow of king Zahir Shah by Daoud Khan in 1973, Khalis reportedly wrote a book criticizing Daoud's administration, which forced him to flee to Pakistan in 1974. There he joined Hekmatyar's Islamic Party (Hezb-e Islami). After the Soviet invasion of Afghanistan, Khalis broke with Hekmatyar and established his own party (Hezb-e Islami Khalis). Unlike some other leaders of the Afghan mujahideen, Khalis depended more on his tribal support rather than religious to gather followers in his native Nangarhar province against the Democratic Republic.

Khalis reportedly entered Afghanistan many times to join his forces in waging war against the Soviets and their local proxies. Many prominent mujahideen commanders including Abdul Haq, Amin Wardak Faisal Babakarkhail and Jalaluddin Haqqani were affiliated with Hezb-e-Islami Khalis.

After the fall of the Communist regime in 1992, Khalis participated in the interim Islamic State government. He was a member of the Leadership Council (Shura-ye Qiyaadi), but held no other official post. Instead of moving to Kabul, he chose to remain in Nangarhar. His party controlled major parts of this politically and strategically important province. The Taliban brought Nangarhar under their control in September 1996 and Khalis was supportive of the Taliban movement and had a close relationship with Taliban commanders.

Khalis resided in Pakistan in the late 1990s. After the fall of the Taliban, his supporters regained their stronghold in Jalalabad where Khalis exerted considerable influence, although he held no official post. Two of his close associates, Haji Abdul Qadir and Haji Din Mohammad served as governors of Nangarhar Province after the fall of the Communist regime.

Steve Coll described Yunus Khalis as "an octogenarian who took teenage wives."

According to a statement from his son Anwar ul Haq Mujahid, leader of the insurgent group Tora Bora Military Front, Khalis died on 19 July 2006.

Books
The author of many essays and poetry collections, his publications include:

Pashto
Dīnī malghalirī, Kābul : Dawlatī Maṭbaʻh, 1957, 140 p. Fundamentals of Islam.
Damūnah aw dāne : shiʻrī ṭolgah, Peṣhawar : Iḥsān Khparandwiyah Ṭolanah, 2002, 124 p. Pashto poetry.
Da Islāmī ʻālam nan aw parūn : da Khāliṣ Bābā da khawro waro līkno tolkah, Peṣhawar : Iḥsān Khparndwiyah Ṭolanah, 2002, 91 p. Collection of articles arranged by ʻAbd al-Hādī Mulākhel.

Dari
Islām va ʻAdālat-i Ijtimāʻī, Kābul : Anjuman-i Tarbīyah-ʼi Afkār, 1958, 326 p. Translation from Arabic of Sayyid Qutb's Social Justice in Islam.

References

External links
 Biography at www.khyber.org
 Khalis and the Moderate Parties – Library of Congress country studies

1910s births
2006 deaths
Pashto-language poets
History of Nangarhar Province
People from Nangarhar Province
Hezb-i Islami Khalis politicians
Pashtun people
Mujahideen members of the Soviet–Afghan War
Anti-Shi'ism
Afghan expatriates in Pakistan
Salafi jihadists
Darul Uloom Haqqania alumni